Clara Johanna Mannheimer (born 13 September 1968 in Örgryte, Sweden) is a Swedish journalist, who is a producer and project manager at SVT Kultur & Samhälle where she works on the TV program Kobra.

Mannheimer has a magister professional degree from Uppsala University and has studied at journalist university college. She has been a society reporter in the TV program Elbyl and editor-in-chief for Nöjesguiden. She has presented programs in Sveriges Radio, among them Sommar on 8 August 1996.

She is daughter to the lawyer Jon Mannheimer and cousin to radio presenter Anna Mannheimer.

References

1968 births
Living people
Sommar (radio program) hosts
Swedish radio presenters
Swedish journalists
Swedish women journalists
Swedish television hosts
Swedish women television presenters
Swedish women radio presenters